The Wandering Earth 2 is a 2023 Chinese science fiction action-adventure film directed and co-written by Frant Gwo, and starring Andy Lau, Wu Jing and Li Xuejian. The film is a prequel to the 2019 film The Wandering Earth, which is based on the short story of the same name by Liu Cixin, who serves as the film's producer.

After the major box-office success of its predecessor, a sequel was announced by Guo on 20 November 2019 before it was greenlit on 21 July 2021, with production officially starting on 13 October 2021. The Wandering Earth 2 was released on 22 January 2023, the same day as the Chinese New Year Day.

Plot and background
As the Sun becomes an expanding red giant and threatens to engulf the Earth in 100 years, the United Nations, now renamed as the United Earth Government (UEG), decides to proceed with the Moving Mountain Project, the pilot program to build thousands of gigantic ion engines that can propel the Earth out of the Solar System towards another habitable star system. In doing so, the UEG shuts down and bans the Digital Life Project (DLP), a radical group who believe humanity's future is in digital immortality by developing mind uploading technologies, despite skepticism and increasingly violent protests from the public.

The first phase of the Moving Mountain Project is to build and test an ion engine on the Moon. However, a series of terrorist attacks by well-armed DLP supporters on the UEG facilities in 2044 resulted in a hacked drone attack on the space elevator in Libervile,Gabon, as well as a coordinated hacking of the elevator vehicles by highly trained infiltrators, with the aim of destroying the Ark Space Station supplying the lunar operation. Although UEG trainee astronaut Liu Peiqiang and his fellow trainees manage to defeat the hijackers on their vehicles, both the space elevator and Ark Space station are critically damaged and crash down to Earth.

To restore public faith in the Moving Mountain Project, Liu Peiqiang and other UEG engineers are sent to the moon to work on finishing construction of three lunar engines, which are prototypes to demonstrate the function before installing the first engines on Earth. Along with this, computer engineer Tu Hengyu, who had previously worked on the Digital Life Project before it was banned, works on incorporating the new 550 Series quantum computer,which was the original edition of 550C, will both control the highly efficient automated construction of the engines, and also control the operation once the engines are to be tested. Tu, in his spare time, views a simulation of his daughter, who had died in a car crash; but due to the limitations of the computer 550A, her digital consciousness can only live for two minutes before restarting.However,the computer of 550C was damaged and need to use 550A for the testing.Tu have to accept,but asked Ma Zhao to invent future versions of the 550 series.

In the next 14 years, the UEG quells the DLP supporters, gathers resources and builds over 7000 engines that stop the Earth's rotation. The Moving Mountain Project is officially renamed as the Wandering Earth Project, and the three completed lunar engines start to propel the Moon away from Earth. In 2058, Tu Hengyu decides to upload the recorded consciousness of his deceased daughter into the latest 550W supercomputer. Immediately after doing this upload, the lunar engines fire and then explode, sending the Moon on a collision course towards Earth.

To deal with the Moon crisis, the UEG initiates a backup plan that involves detonating all of the Earth's nuclear weapons on the lunar surface and triggering its implosion. The mission faces numerous setbacks due to the difficulties in nuclear code decryption, the flooding of Internet root server data centers that allow coordinated detonation control, and the short time window before the moon reaches the Roche limit and fragments into pieces which will destroy the Earth. After the code deciphering hits a deadlock, hundreds of astronauts over the age of 50 voluntarily sacrifice themselves in order to manually detonate the nukes. Liu narrowly survives the nuclear detonation, managing to pilot a capsule back to the Navigation Space Station. Meanwhile on Earth, Tu, who is sent to help reboot the flooded Beijing server, uploads a copy of his own recorded consciousness into the network before drowning. His digital self manages to reboot the last Internet server in time, activating the Earth engines en masse and moving the Earth away from the course of the lunar debris. The Wandering Earth Project then officially begins with the Earth's course towards Jupiter.

In a mid-credits scene, Tu's digital self is addressed by the 550W artificial intelligence, who now goes by the personified name "MOSS" ("550W" upside down). The now-sentient supercomputer reveals that it has been behind every crisis that has ever harmed humanity's efforts to save themselves, adding that it will also trigger many more in the future.

Cast
Andy Lau as Tu Hengyu (图恒宇), a computer scientist who worked on both the Digital Life Project and the Moving Mountain Project.
Wu Jing as Liu Peiqiang (刘培强), a UEG trainee astronaut who survives numerous crises involving the Moving Mountain Project and the main protagonist of the first movie.
Li Xuejian as Zhou Zhezhi (周喆直), the Chinese ambassador to the UEG.
Sha Yi as Zhang Peng (张鹏), a senior UEG fighter pilot and Liu's mentor.
Ning Li as Ma Zhao (马兆), AI and quantum computing researcher and Tu's colleague.
Wang Zhi as Han Duoduo (韩朵朵), Liu Peiqiang's fellow trainee and later wife. She eventually succumbs to cancer from radiation sickness.
Zhu Yanmanzi as Hao Xiaoxi (郝晓晞), Zhou's personal assistant and protégé.
 Khalid Ghanem as tower commander , American commander 
Andy Friend as Mike, the American ambassador to the UEG and a good friend of Zhou.
Vitalli Makarychev as Andre Graschnov, a senior UEG fighter pilot and Zhang's close friend
Clara Lee, Tony Nicholson and Vladimir Ershov as the three space elevator hijackers who tried to impersonate astronaut trainees.

The Wandering Earth 2 is dedicated to Ng Man-Tat, who died of liver cancer in 2021 after starring as Han Zi'ang in the first movie. Ng appears in a brief CGI-rendered cameo.

Production

Development
After The Wandering Earth was released to major commercial success in January 2019, director Frant Gwo announced at the Golden Rooster Awards on 20 November of the same year that a sequel was in the works, revealing that audiences were being conducted and sorted to guide the sequel's guide structure which will focus more on characters' emotions as well as improving visual effects. Gwo also stated that production may not begin for four years. On 2 December 2020, Gwo announced at the 2020 Golden Rooster Awards that the shooting plan for the sequel has initiated and have set the release date for 22 January 2023, the first day of the Chinese New Year holidays. A teaser poster which features the phrase "Goodbye Solar System" written in numerous different languages was also released.

On 18 June 2021, Andy Lau announced during a live broadcast celebration of the 33rd anniversary of his fan club, Andy World Club, that he will be starring in the film. On 21 July 2021, it was reported the film has been approved by the National Radio and Television Administration and production is set to take place from October 2021 to March 2022 in Qingdao and Haikou. Wu Jing was confirmed to return to the prequel. Aside from directing duties, Guo also co-wrote the script with producer Gong Ge'er while the film will be financed by Guo's company, Guo Fan Culture and Media and China Film Company.

Filming 
Principal photography officially began on 13 October 2021 in Qingdao, where a production commencement ceremony was held. Aside from Andy Lau and Wu Jing, actor Zhang Fengyi was also present, confirming his participation.

Post-production

Music

Release
On 19 August 2022, The Wandering Earth 2 officially released the first "a little white dot" version of the trailer.

The Wandering Earth 2 was theatrically released on 22 January 2023, the first day of the Chinese New Year holidays. It also has North American limited release by Well Go USA Entertainment in 125 screens, 30 IMAX, starting day-and-date 22 January.

Reception

Box office

Critical response
The Wandering Earth 2 has been met with generally positive reviews by critics. On Rotten Tomatoes, the film has an approval rating of 79% based on 19 reviews. Metacritic, which uses a weighted average, assigned the film a score of 56 out of 100, based on 7 critics, indicating "mixed or average reviews".

See also
Andy Lau filmography

Notes

References

External links
 
 
 
 

2023 films
2023 science fiction action films
2023 action adventure films
2020s science fiction adventure films
Chinese action adventure films
Chinese disaster films
Chinese science fiction action films
Chinese prequel films
IMAX films
Post-apocalyptic films
Space adventure films
Sun in film
Jupiter in film
Mandarin-language films
Films about astronauts
Films based on Chinese novels
Films based on science fiction novels
Films directed by Frant Gwo
Films set in the future
Films shot in Shandong
Films shot in Hainan
Films shot in Italy
Films shot in Paris
Films shot in India
Films shot in Iceland
Films shot in Ireland
Films shot in New York City
Chinese New Year films
China Film Group Corporation films
Films about consciousness transfer
2023 in Chinese cinema